Kwu Hang is a village in Tsuen Wan District, Hong Kong.

External links
 Delineation of area of existing village Kwu Hang (Tsuen Wan) for election of resident representative (2019 to 2022)

Villages in Tsuen Wan District, Hong Kong